May God Forgive You... But I Won't  is a 1968 Italian Spaghetti Western film written and directed by Vincenzo Musolino.

Plot
Cjamango's entire family has been exterminated and he decides to take revenge, (helped by a Mexican who saw the bandits). In the way Cjamango learns that it was his father-in-law that had armed the bandits to avenge himself of some disgrace he had suffered in the form of Cjamango's past.

Cast 

 George Ardisson as Django / Cjamango McDonald
 Dragomir Bojanić as  Dick Smart (credited as "Anthony Ghidra")
 Peter Martell as  Jack Smart
 Cristina Iosani as  Virginia Stuart 
 Dante Maggio as  Bartender
 Luigi Pavese as  Stuart 
 Ignazio Spalla as  Barrica (credited as  "Pedro Sanchez")
  Lilli Lembo as  Dick's Friend 
 Franco Pesce as an Undertaker
 Franco Latini as an Undertaker
 Antonio Di Mitri as  Manuel (credited as  "George Stevenson")
 Tano Cimarosa as a Bandit

References

External links

Spaghetti Western films
1968 Western (genre) films
1968 films
Films shot in Almería
1960s Italian-language films
1960s Italian films